FK Salaspils is a Latvian football club. They compete in  the second-highest division of Latvian football (2. līga) and the Latvian Football Cup.
They are based in town Salaspils.

References

Football clubs in Latvia